William Radclyffe (20 October 1783 – 29 December 1855) was an English engraver and painter.
 
Born in Birmingham and self-educated, he was apprenticed to a letter engraver and studied drawing under Joseph Barber with his cousin John Pye. Both planned to move to London when their apprenticeships were complete in 1801, but Radclyffe remained in Birmingham for financial reasons and set up as an engraver and copperplate printer.

Radclyffe became well known as an engraver of landscapes, making prints after David Cox, J. M. W. Turner and Peter De Wint and illustrating numerous works of travel literature. He taught James Tibbits Willmore.

Radclyffe's son was the painter Charles Walter Radclyffe.

References

External links 

 William Radclyffe at Wikisource

1783 births
1855 deaths
English engravers
Artists from Birmingham, West Midlands
Members and Associates of the Royal Birmingham Society of Artists
19th-century English painters
English male painters
19th-century English male artists